Mahmudabad-e Sofla (also Romanized as Maḩmūdābād-e Soflá; also known as Moḩammadābād, Muhammadābād, Mahmūdābād, Maḩmūdābād-e Pā’īn, and Maḩmūdābād Pā’īn) is a village in Mian Jam Rural District, in the Central District of Torbat-e Jam County, Razavi Khorasan Province, Iran. At the 2006 census, its population was 1,953, in 455 families.

References 

Populated places in Torbat-e Jam County